Markus Alexej Persson (born 1 June 1979), also known as Notch, is a Swedish video game programmer and designer. He is best known for creating the sandbox video game Minecraft and for founding the video game company Mojang in 2009.

Persson's principal venture for founding Mojang was Minecraft which gained popularity and support since its tech demo in 2009. Since then, he has gained significant notability within the video game industry, winning multiple awards and establishing relations with the industry's figureheads. He retained his position as the lead designer of Minecraft until the game's official launch in 2011, after which he transferred creative authority to Jens Bergensten. He had continued to work on Minecraft until he left Mojang in September 2014, after its acquisition by Microsoft for $2.5 billion. Microsoft eventually dissociated from Persson following controversial comments regarding topics such as race and gender on his Twitter account.

Biography
Markus Alexej Persson was born in Stockholm, Sweden, to a Finnish mother and a Swedish father on 1 June 1979. He lived in Edsbyn for the first seven years of his life before his family moved back to Stockholm. He began programming on his father's Commodore 128 home computer at the age of seven. Having experimented with various type-in programs he produced his first game at the age of eight, a text-based adventure game. Professionally he had worked as a game developer for King for over four years, until 2009. Afterwards he worked as a programmer for Jalbum. He is also one of the founders of Wurm Online, though he no longer works on it. Outside of work, he has made seven games for competitions. He is the central figure of Minecraft: The Story of Mojang, a documentary by 2 Player Productions about the rise of Minecraft and Mojang.

Personal life
Persson is a member of the Swedish chapter of Mensa. In 2011, he married Elin Zetterstrand and had a daughter. On 15 August 2012, he announced that he and his wife had filed for divorce. The divorce was finalized later that year.

Persson has criticized both piracy and the stance of large game companies on piracy; additionally, he is a member of the Pirate Party of Sweden. He is an atheist and has donated to Médecins Sans Frontières (Doctors Without Borders). Under his direction, Mojang contributed a week to developing Catacomb Snatch for the Humble Indie Bundle; the $458,248 raised was donated to charity.

In December 2014, Persson purchased a home in Trousdale Estates, Beverly Hills, CA for $70 million, a record sales price for Beverly Hills at the time.

Games

Minecraft

Persson's most popular creation is the survival sandbox game Minecraft, which was first publicly available on 17 May 2009 and fully released on 18 November 2011. Persson left his job as a game developer to work on Minecraft full-time until completion. In early 2011, Mojang AB sold the one millionth copy of the game, several months later their second, and several more their third. Mojang hired several new staff members for the Minecraft team, while Persson passed the lead developer role to Jens Bergensten. He stopped working on Minecraft after a deal with Microsoft to sell Mojang for $2.5 billion. This brought his net worth to US$1.5 billion.

Caller's Bane

Persson and Jakob Porsér came up with the idea for Scrolls including elements from board games and collectible card games. Persson noted that he will not be actively involved in development of the game and that Porsér will be developing it. Persson revealed on his tumblr blog on 5 August 2011 that he was being sued by a Swedish law firm representing Bethesda Softworks over the trademarked name of Scrolls, claiming that it conflicted with their The Elder Scrolls series of games. On 17 August 2011, Persson challenged Bethesda to a Quake 3 tournament to decide the outcome of the naming dispute. On 27 September 2011, Persson confirmed that the lawsuit was going to court. ZeniMax Media, owner of Bethesda Softworks, announced the lawsuit's settlement in March 2012. The settlement allowed Mojang to continue using the Scrolls trademark.

Cliffhorse
Cliffhorse is a humorous game programmed in two hours using the Unity game engine and free assets. The game took inspiration from Skyrims physics engine, "the more embarrassing minimum-effort Greenlight games", Goat Simulator, and Big Rigs: Over the Road Racing. The game was released to Microsoft Windows systems as a honorware early access game the start day of E3 2014, instructing users to donate Dogecoin to "buy" the game before downloading it. The game accumulated over 280,000 dogecoins.

0x10c

Following the end to his involvement with Minecraft, Persson began pre-production of an alternate reality space game set in the distant future in March 2012. On April Fools' Day, Mojang launched a satirical website for Mars Effect (parody of Mass Effect), citing the lawsuit with Bethesda as an inspiration. However, the gameplay elements remained true and on 4 April, Mojang revealed 0x10c (pronounced Ten to the C) as a space sandbox title. Persson officially halted game production in August 2013. However, C418, the composer of the game's soundtrack (as well as that of Minecraft), released an album of the work he had made for the game.

Shambles
In 2013, Persson made a free game called Shambles in the Unity game engine.

Ludum Dare entries
Persson has also participated in several Ludum Dare 48-hour game making competitions.
 Breaking the Tower was a game Persson developed for the entry to the Ludum Dare No. 12 competition. The game takes place on a small island, where the player must gather resources, construct buildings, and train soldiers in order to destroy a large tower on this island. The game received brief gaming media attention.
 Metagun is a 2D platformer created for Ludum Dare no. 18.
 Prelude of the Chambered is a game Persson developed for the entry to the Ludum Dare No. 21 competition. Prelude of the Chambered is a short first-person dungeon crawler video game.
 Minicraft is a game developed for Ludum Dare No. 22, held 16–19 December 2011. It is a small top-down game with similarities to Zelda and influenced by Minecraft. It is written in Java.

Awards and nominations 

|-
| 2011
| Minecraft
| Best Debut Game, Innovation Award, Best Downloadable Game
| Game Developers Choice Awards
| 
| 
| 
|-
| 2012
| Minecraft
| BAFTA Special Award
| BAFTA
| 
| 
| 
|-
| 2016
| Minecraft
| Pioneer Award Winner
| Game Developers Choice Awards
| 
| Award formerly known as the First Penguin Award
|

Controversial views
Persson has received criticism for political and social opinions he has expressed on social media since around 2017. He claimed feminism was a "social disease", and called video game developer and feminism supporter Zoë Quinn a "cunt". He took offence to gay pride celebrations, asserting there should be heterosexual pride days and stating that opponents to his ideas "deserve to be shot". After facing backlash, he deleted the tweets and rescinded his statements, writing "So yeah, it's about pride of daring to express, not about pride of being who you are. I get it now." Persson said in social media that "It's okay to be white" and that he believed privilege is a "made up metric". He has promoted claims that people are fined for "using the wrong pronoun". Persson has also faced criticism for tweeting in support of QAnon, stating that "Q is legit. Don't trust the media."

In March 2019, a Minecraft update removed all mentions of Persson from the game's menu, though his name is still in the credits. Microsoft did not explain this action, but its timing led multiple news outlets to conclude it was related to the controversies associated with him. Persson was not invited to the game's tenth anniversary event later in 2019, with Microsoft saying that his views "do not reflect those of Microsoft or Mojang".

References

External links

 
 
 notch.net archives
 notch.tumblr.com archives

 
1979 births
BAFTA winners (people)
Businesspeople from Stockholm
Game Developers Conference Pioneer Award recipients
Indie video game developers
Living people
Male critics of feminism
Mensans
Mojang Studios
People from Beverly Hills, California
Swedish atheists
Swedish billionaires
Swedish computer programmers
Swedish electronic musicians
Swedish people of Finnish descent
Swedish philanthropists
Video game designers
Video game programmers